Kopkaka (Kopka) is one of the Ok languages of West Papua.

References

Languages of western New Guinea
Ok languages